Konya (English:Girl) is an Indian Bengali soap opera produced by Ekta Kapoor under her banner Balaji Telefilms. The series premiered on 28 February 2011 and aired on Zee Bangla.

Plot
Kanya is the story of an eight-year-old girl born into a family of thieves who struggles to find acceptance in her own community. In spite of being blessed by divine powers she finds herself being labeled witch and ostracized by her own family.

The series is the story of her sensitive and kind nature that wins the hearts of strangers but her powers remain a curse for her in more ways than one.

Cast
 Sumanta Mukherjee 
 Shubhankar Saha 
 Shreyasee Samanta
 Arindam Chatterjee 
 Shahana Sen

References

External links
 Official Website

Balaji Telefilms television series
2010 Indian television series debuts
Bengali-language television programming in India
Zee Bangla original programming